Robin Gene Tornow (April 20, 1942 – August 22, 2010) was a brigadier general in the United States Air Force.

Biography
Tornow was born in Monroe, Wisconsin, in 1942. He attended the University of Texas at Austin. Tornow died on August 22, 2010.

Career
Tornow graduated from the United States Air Force Academy in 1964. During the Vietnam War he served with the 19th Tactical Air Support Squadron. Following his service in the war he was assigned to RAF Lakenheath in England and later joined the faculty at the Air Force Academy. Later he was given command of the 334th Tactical Fighter Squadron. In 1983 he was assigned to The Pentagon and in 1986 he was given command of the 405th Tactical Training Wing. He assumed command of the United States Air Force Southern Air Division in 1988, which he headed during the United States invasion of Panama. In 1990 he was named Commandant of the Air Force Reserve Officer Training Corps. His retirement was effective as of June 1, 1993.

Awards he received include the Silver Star, the Legion of Merit with oak leaf cluster, the Distinguished Flying Cross, the Meritorious Service Medal with oak leaf cluster, the Air Medal with three silver oak leaf clusters and bronze oak leaf cluster, the Air Force Commendation Medal with oak leaf cluster, and the Army Commendation Medal.

References

1942 births
2010 deaths
People from Monroe, Wisconsin
Military personnel from Wisconsin
United States Air Force generals
Recipients of the Silver Star
Recipients of the Legion of Merit
Recipients of the Distinguished Flying Cross (United States)
Recipients of the Air Medal
United States Air Force personnel of the Vietnam War
United States Air Force Academy faculty
United States Air Force Academy alumni
University of Texas at Austin alumni
Air War College alumni